Darius Kampa (born 16 January 1977 in Kędzierzyn-Koźle, Silesia, Poland) is a German former footballer who played as a goalkeeper. He also holds Polish citizenship. He spent five seasons in the Bundesliga with 1. FC Nürnberg and Borussia Mönchengladbach.

References

External links
 

1977 births
Living people
Association football goalkeepers
German footballers
Germany under-21 international footballers
People from Kędzierzyn-Koźle
German people of Polish descent
FC Augsburg players
1. FC Nürnberg players
Borussia Mönchengladbach players
Zalaegerszegi TE players
SK Sturm Graz players
SpVgg Unterhaching players
Bundesliga players
2. Bundesliga players
3. Liga players